Martin Goeres (born August 12, 1984) is a German actor and stuntman.

Biography

Born in West Berlin, Goeres started his acting career at the age of 10. Staying in the business throughout his youth, he decided to pursue a career as a stuntman due to his martial arts and fighting skills. Co-founding the 'Perfect Action Stunt Team' also led him to work behind the camera as a pyrotechnican and stunt coordinator. He has since committed himself to extensive study with Giles Foreman, Reuven Adiv, Tony Woolf, renowned acting coach Larry Moss, and others. After several years of working for international productions like "Dracula", "Mission Impossible - Rouge Nation", "Wonder Woman" and others Martin Goeres founded his own full action service company MG ACTION.

Filmography

Acting
1995: Flieg Opa, flieg! (TV Series) - Max Teichmann
2001: Heidi M. - Max
2003: Familie Dr. Kleist (TV Movie)
2004: Before the Fall - Siegfried Gladen
2005: Kampfansage - Der letzte Schüler - Civil War Fighter
2006: Winter Journey - 
2009: Ninja Assassin
2011: Hanna - CIA Agent (uncredited)
2011: Don 2 - Jabbar's Goon
2015: Victoria - SEK 1
2015: What You Want Is Gone Forever - Ariel
2015: Kartoffelsalat - Kommissar Kuddel
2017: Schneeflöckchen - Gustav

SFX & stunt
2004: Bye Bye Berlusconi
2005: V for Vendetta
2007: Beyond Remedy aka Fear
2007: Speed Racer
2007: Valkyrie
2008: Ninja Assassin
2009: Inglourious Basterds
2011: Don 2

External links

Official Homepage
MG ACTION - to serve the story®

1984 births
Living people
German stunt performers
Male actors from Berlin
German male film actors
German male television actors